Mansura  is a small town in the District of Jebel el-Akhdar in north-eastern Libya and it is located 15 km northeast of Beida. the town is famous for its chest diseases hospital which is considered to be the best in the country because of its location.

External links
Satellite map at Maplandia.com
Search for Mansura, Libya in the MSN Encarta atlas

References

Populated places in Jabal al Akhdar